The 2020 McGrath Cup is inter-county Gaelic football competition in the province of Munster, played by all six county teams. It was won by Limerick, who won their first Cup since 2005.

Format
The teams are drawn into two groups of three teams. Each team plays the other teams in its group once, earning 2 points for a win and 1 for a draw. The two group winners play in the final. If the final is a draw, a penalty shoot-out is used to decide the winner; there is no extra time played.

Group stage

Group A

Group B

Final

References

McGrath Cup
McGrath Cup